Pietro Bargagli (2 August 1844, Siena – November 1918 Florence) was an Italian entomologist  who specialised in Coleoptera. His collection is in La Specola and the Istituto Sperimentale per la Zoologia Agraria. He was a member of La Società Entomologica Italiana.

Works
Partial list.
Escursioni entomologiche sulla montagna di Cetona. Bullettino della Società Entomologica italiana 2: 169-176 (1870)
Materiali per la fauna entomologica dell'isola Sardegna. Bull. Soc. ent. Hal., 5: 244-256 (1873).
Ricordi di una escursione entomologica al Monte Amiata. Bullettino della Società Entomologica italiana 7: 122-133 (1875).
Ricordi di una escursione entomologica al Monte Amiata. Coleotteri. Bullettino della Società Entomologica italiana 7: 257-265 (1875).
Insetti Comestibili Lettura nell. Soc. Entomol. Ital. Revista Europaea-Riv. Internaz.  Fasc. 16, 6, 11 pp (1877)
 Note intorno alla biologia di alcuni Coleotteri. Bolletino della Società Entomologica italiana, Genova, 16 (1884).

References
Conci, C. & Poggi, R. 1996: Iconography of Italian Entomologists, with essential biographical data. Mem. Soc. Ent. Ital. 75 159-382, 418 Fig.

Italian entomologists
1844 births
1918 deaths